Skadi Walter (born 18 April 1964) is a German speed skater. She competed in the women's 500 metres at the 1984 Winter Olympics. Her daughter is the speed skater Bianca Walter.

References

External links
 

1964 births
Living people
German female speed skaters
Olympic speed skaters of East Germany
Speed skaters at the 1984 Winter Olympics
Sportspeople from Halle (Saale)